Papua New Guinea competed at the 2012 Summer Olympics in London, from 27 July to 12 August 2012. This was the nation's ninth appearance at the Olympics. Papua New Guinea has appeared at every Summer Olympics since 1976, except the 1980 Summer Olympics in Moscow because of its partial support to the United States boycott.

Papua New Guinea Olympic Committee (PNGOC) sent a total of 8 athletes to the Games, an equal share of men and women, to compete in 5 different sports. Swimmer Ryan Pini, who competed at his third Olympics, emerged as the nation's most successful athlete in history, after finishing eighth from Beijing in the men's butterfly event. Sprinter Toea Wisil, who dominated the preliminary standings in London, was the nation's flag bearer at the opening ceremony. Among the sports played by the athletes, Papua New Guinea marked its Olympic debut in judo.

Papua New Guinea, however, has yet to win its first ever Olympic medal.

Athletics

Men

Women

Key
Note–Ranks given for track events are within the athlete's heat only
Q = Qualified for the next round
q = Qualified for the next round as a fastest loser or, in field events, by position without achieving the qualifying target
NR = National record
N/A = Round not applicable for the event
Bye = Athlete not required to compete in round

Judo

Papua New Guinea has qualified 1 judoka

Swimming

One swimmer from Papua New Guinea had further achieved qualifying standards in one event at the Olympic Qualifying Time (OQT). Papua New Guinea also has gained two "Universality places" from the FINA.

Men

Women

Taekwondo

Papua New Guinea has qualified one quota place in Taekwondo.

Weightlifting

Papua New Guinea has earned a quota in the men's and women's event.

References

2012 in Papua New Guinean sport
Nations at the 2012 Summer Olympics
2012